Robert J. Mattos (September 28, 1941 – March 14, 2010) was an American football coach. He served as the head football coach at California State University, Sacramento from 1978 to 1992, compiling a record of 84–73–2. He is the only coach in the school's history to have a winning record. Prior to coaching at Sacramento State, Mattos was the head football coach at Stagg High School in Stockton, California.  Mattos died of brain cancer March 14, 2010, at his home in Rancho Murieta, California.

Head coaching record

College

References

External links
 

1941 births
2010 deaths
Sacramento State Hornets football coaches
Sacramento State Hornets football players
High school football coaches in California
People from Ceres, California
Players of American football from California
Deaths from brain cancer in the United States
Deaths from cancer in California